"I Quit Drinking" is a song by American singer Kelsea Ballerini and American pop band LANY. It was released on June 9, 2021, via Black River Entertainment and Warner Chappell Music. Ballerini co-wrote the song with Nicolle Galyon and Paul Jason Klein, while Jimmy Robbins and Noah Conrad produced it.

Background and content
Ballerini first performed the song with Paul Klein of pop group LANY at the 2021 CMT Music Awards. According to a press release, "I Quit Drinking" is a "break up anthem about quitting drinking" due to it "bring[ing] back too many memories of a past relationship". A press release by Black River Entertainment mentioned the song "describe[s] a couple whose relationship was centered around being the life of the party. When the giddy romance fizzles out, it seems, so does the appeal of the booze."

Critical reception
Rob Costa of Music Talkers praised the combination for doing "a great job painting a picture of reflection, relationships, sacrifice, and the reasons for getting sober. The work put into creating conversational lyrics has paid off here, making the lyrics a real highlight of the song."

Music video
The music video was released on June 15, 2021, and directed by Blythe Thomas. The video was filmed in "the hills of California". It shows Ballerini and Klein as "former lovers recalling happier times together" who can no longer "enjoy the taste of champagne, whiskey, or other alcoholic beverages now" due to it "remind[ing] them of their days as a couple". Finally they sing face-to-face in a rainstorm.

Commercial performance
"I Quit Drinking" debuted at number 30 on the Billboard Hot Country Songs chart dated June 26, 2021, after its release.

Charts

Weekly charts

Year-end charts

Certifications

Release history

References

2021 songs
2021 singles
Kelsea Ballerini songs
LANY songs
Songs written by Kelsea Ballerini
Songs written by Nicolle Galyon
Black River Entertainment singles
Warner Music Group singles